The 1994 Auto Trader RAC British Touring Car Championship season was the 37th British Touring Car Championship (BTCC) season.

Changes for 1994
The number of double header meetings were increased from three to eight
Double headers now awarded full points in both races instead of half, as had previously been the case

Season summary
The lead up to the 1994 season saw both consolidation and major news amongst the manufacturers. Reigning champions BMW retained Joachim Winkelhock and Steve Soper, and the team would again be managed by works outfit Schnitzer Motorsport. Soper however would miss some races when they clashed with his JTCC programme; his place would then be taken by Roberto Ravaglia. Ford were looking to build on their late 1993 success with Paul Radisich and Andy Rouse, while Toyota added Tim Sugden to their 1993 drivers Will Hoy and Julian Bailey. While Vauxhall retained drivers John Cleland and Jeff Allam they had handed over the running of their works team to Ray Mallock Ltd., who had previously run semi-works cars as Ecurie Ecosse.

Renault also retained their drivers Alain Menu and Tim Harvey, but replaced their Renault 19 with more modern Lagunas. Keith O’Dor continued with Nissan but was joined by ex-Formula One driver Eric van de Poele, who replaced Win Percy. Patrick Watts moved from Mazda to Peugeot, replacing Robb Gravett, while Mazda expanded to a two-car line up with drivers Matt Neal and David Leslie.

Two new manufacturers joined the championship. Tom Walkinshaw made a comeback with Volvo, the Swedish manufacturer surprisingly choosing to run the estate version of their 850 model. 1988 Le Mans winner Jan Lammers and Swedish Formula Three racer Rickard Rydell would be the team’s two drivers. Alfa Romeo was the other manufacturer to join; Italian works outfit Alfa Corse would run two cars for Gabriele Tarquini and Giampiero Simoni. Alfa had produced a unique homologation special version of their 155 model complete with wings and spoilers, significantly improving the aerodynamics of the car. The 155 was to revolutionize Super Touring racing. The rules stated that aerodynamic wings could be used provided they were fitted to a limited number of road cars. Peugeot, Ford and Toyota had all run with rear spoilers in previous years due to this. Alfa exploited the rules by releasing a special edition of the 155 called the 'Silverstone' just to gain the aero advantage. Renault and BMW eventually followed suit by releasing limited "homologation special" editions of their cars, the Laguna Airflow and the 318is, respectively.

The start of the season showed that Alfa Romeo had a substantial advantage over their opponents as Gabriele Tarquini dominated, taking the first five wins of the season. Several complaints and protests were lodged by other manufacturers, and just prior to Oulton Park Alfa were told to run without the aerodynamic aids fitted. Alfa refused and left the circuit in protest, allowing Alain Menu to take Renault’s first win of the season. Eventually matters were resolved and Alfa re-instated after agreeing to run with the spoilers lowered, but having lost out on any points from Oulton Park. Even with lowered spoilers, however, Tarquini was able to keep much of his advantage.

Silverstone hosted the twelfth round of the championship, and there rule changes were exploited by other manufacturers to add aerodynamic aids to their own cars. This levelled the playing field considerably and allowed Joachim Winkelhock to make a bid for victory, overtaking Tarquini and winning the race. Tarquini would only win one more race that season, but was always in contention: it was not so much a matter of if but when the Italian would become champion. When turned out to be the penultimate weekend at Silverstone, where Tarquini’s second place in the first race of the day secured the title for him. The main battle going into the final rounds at Donington Park was for second place, and would stand between Alain Menu and Paul Radisich. Radisich won the first race of the day bringing him up to level on points with Menu, but mechanical gremlins put a stop to his challenge in the second race. Menu thus finished second in the championship from Radisich, with John Cleland in fourth and Simoni in fifth.

Teams and drivers

BTCC

ToCA Shoot Out

Race calendar and winners
All races were held in the United Kingdom.

Championship results

Drivers Championship
(key) (Races in bold indicate pole position; races in italics indicate fastest lap)

Race 2 grid for Double Headers are based on Race 1 results.

Privateers Championship

Manufacturers Championship

References

External links
 Full championship results

1994 Season
Touring Car Championship Season